Abies cephalonica or Greek fir is a fir native to the mountains of Greece, primarily in the Peloponnesos and the island of Kefallonia, intergrading with the closely related Bulgarian fir further north in the Pindus mountains of northern Greece.

The tip of the leaf is pointed, usually fairly sharply but sometimes with a blunt tip, particularly on slow-growing shoots on older trees.

It is also closely related to Nordmann fir to the east in northern Turkey.

Uses
Greek fir was important in the past for wood for general construction, but it is too rare to be of significant value now. It is also grown as an ornamental tree in parks and large gardens, though in areas that often get late frosts it is prone to frost damage, as it is one of the first conifers to open fresh growth in spring.

Etymology 
The generic name Abies, already used by the Latins, could, according to an etymological interpretation, derive from the Greek word ἄβιος = long-lived. The specific name cephalonica derives from the Greek Cephallenia and refers to the largest of the Ionian islands, which falls within the range of the species.

Description

Carriage 
The Cephalonian fir has a conical shape, it rarely exceeds 25 m, even if it can reach 35 m. The branches are arranged in regular whorls and the small branches are shiny brown, close together and glabrous. Among the fir trees it is one of those with the thickest crown.

Leaves 
They are 2-3 cm long, needle -like, prickly and bright green on the upper face; they have two silvery white streaks separated by a green vein below. They are arranged radially around the branches.

References

External links

Photos of trees in Peloponnesos, Greece (captions in Italian; "abete" = Greek Fir, "pino nero" = Black Pine)
Photo of a cone
Abies cephalonica. Distribution map, genetic conservation units and related resources. European Forest Genetic Resources Programme (EUFORGEN)

cephalonica
Trees of Europe
Endemic flora of Greece
Cephalonia
Plants described in 1838